The Cocos (Keeling) Islands are located in the Indian Ocean at 15º06'00.02"S, 97º03'51.42"E. They have nothing to do with the Cocos tectonic plate located along the west coast of Central America. This page requires extensive rework before it is factually correct.

The geology of the Cocos (Keeling) Islands may be a part of the Galapagos hot spot. The island is the mountain top of non-seismic, undersea Cocos Ridge. Although the ridge dates to the Miocene, potassium-argon dating and paleomagnetic research indicates that the above-water part of the island formed within the last two million years in the Quaternary.

A shield volcano built up, followed by explosive eruptions and smaller subsequent eruptions. Alkali basalt and trachyte are the only forms of bedrock on the island and fractional crystallization of olivine and clinopyroxene played a key role in the formation of the rocks. Sediments on the island include sand and gravel from the Holocene and cemented conglomerate made of coral fragments.

References